Rock Hard Ten (April 5, 2001 – November 12, 2021) was an American thoroughbred racehorse and sire. Co-owned and bred by Madeleine Paulson, widow of  Allen E. Paulson, the dark bay horse stood over 17 hands. He was sired by  Kris S., out of the Mr. Prospector mare Tersa.

Three-year-old season 

Rock Hard Ten was a late bloomer and did not race at age two due to shin splints. At age three, he started late in relation to other three-year-olds. Rock Hard Ten stepped up in class four weeks before the Kentucky Derby in the GI Santa Anita Derby and finished second to Castledale but was disqualified and placed third for interference. Due to the late start in the season and his disqualification, Rock Hard Ten did not have enough graded stakes race earnings to qualify for the Kentucky Derby.

The owners of Rock Hard Ten waited two weeks later until the Preakness Stakes. In that race, the colt faced the top four finishers from the Derby, including the eventual champion and dual classic winner, Smarty Jones. In the 2004 Preakness Stakes, Rock Hard Ten was fractious behind the gate and difficult to load. When the gates opened, he broke alertly and jockey Gary Stevens placed him fourth in a field of ten runners. On Pimlico's club house turn, jockey Mike Smith aboard Derby runner-up Lion Heart floated Smarty Jones out wide and in turn pushed the others horses even further outside. Rock Hard Ten was the most affected, pushed out to the six path on the turn and fading to seventh. Stevens wrestled with Rock Hard Ten, fighting to hold him back and conserve ground. On the second turn, he and Eddington made a charge at the leaders. The two moved up to challenge Lion Heart at the top of the lane. Rock Hard Ten then passed Lion Heart for the place spot, holding on to earn $200,000 as the Preakness runner-up. Smarty Jones won the race by the widest margin in 130 years at 11-1/2 lengths.

Following the Preakness, Rock Hard Ten won the GII Swaps Stakes in July at Hollywood Park and the GI Malibu Stakes in December at Santa Anita Park. Rock Hard Ten ran in the Belmont.

Four-year-old season 

At age four, Rock Hard Ten developed physically into one of the largest colts to hit the track in history, standing 17.3 hands. That season, he won the grade two Charles H. Strub Stakes, then one of the biggest prizes for an older horse in the grade one Santa Anita Handicap, and then the grade two Goodwood Breeders' Cup Handicap. He finished his career with an in-the-money percentage of 82%. Out of eleven starts, he won seven, placed once, and came in third once.

Retirement 

Rock Hard Ten stood at stud at Lane's End Farm in Versailles, Kentucky from 2006 until 2012. He was then sold to the Korea Racing Authority (KRA) in South Korea and stood at their Jeju Stud Farm starting with the 2013 breeding season.

Rock Hard Ten died in South Korea on November 12, 2021. According to the KRA, he was moved to an equine hospital after being unable to stand in his paddock and died within 24 hours. The death was reported several days later once it was listed in official KRA records. At the time of his death, Rock Hard Ten had sired 330 winners with his offspring earning more than $27 million in purse money.

Pedigree

References

Racehorses trained in the United States
Racehorses bred in Kentucky
2001 racehorse births
2021 racehorse deaths
American Grade 1 Stakes winners
Thoroughbred family A1